The western sirystes or Chocó sirystes (Sirystes albogriseus) is a species of bird in the family Tyrannidae. It was formerly considered conspecific with the sibilant sirystes.

Distribution and habitat
It is found from Panama to northwestern Colombia and northwestern Ecuador. Its natural habitat is subtropical or tropical moist lowland forests.

References

 Donegan, T.M. 2013b. Vocal variation and species limits in the genus Sirystes (Tyrannidae). Conservacion Colombiana 19: 11–30.
 

western sirystes
Birds of the Tumbes-Chocó-Magdalena
western sirystes